The Kenya Medical Practitioners and Dentists Council is a statutory body which regulates the training and practice of medicine, dentistry and community oral health in Kenya.

External Links 
First ever scope of practice developed

Medical Practitioners and Dentists Council

References

Medical and health organisations based in Kenya